Moonseed may refer to:
Cocculus, a genus of woody vines and shrubs with the common name moonseed
Menispermum, a genus of deciduous climbing woody vines with the common name moonseed
 Moonseed (novel), a 1998 science fiction novel by Stephen Baxter